Don't Mention the War is the fourth studio album by British indie pop musical project White Town, released in 2006 through Bzangy Records. The title is a dual reference to "The Germans", an episode of the English sitcom Fawlty Towers, and to the Iraq War.

Track listing

References

White Town albums
2006 albums
Alternative rock albums by English artists
Electronic albums by English artists